Warren Keith Urbom (December 17, 1925 – July 28, 2017) was a United States district judge of the United States District Court for the District of Nebraska.

Education and career
Born in Atlanta, Nebraska, Urbom was a Technical Sergeant in the United States Army during World War II, from 1944 to 1946. He received an Artium Baccalaureus from Nebraska Wesleyan University in 1950 and a Juris Doctor from the University of Michigan Law School in 1953. He was in private practice in Lincoln, Nebraska from 1953 to 1970.

Federal judicial service

On March 11, 1970, Urbom was nominated by President Richard Nixon to a seat on the United States District Court for the District of Nebraska vacated by Robert Van Pelt. Urbom was confirmed by the United States Senate on April 23, 1970, and received his commission on April 24, 1970. He served as chief judge from 1972 to 1986. He was also an adjunct instructor at the University of Nebraska–Lincoln College of Law from 1979 to 1990. He assumed senior status on December 31, 1990.

Later life and death

Urbom assumed inactive status on April 25, 2014, meaning that while he remained a Federal Judge, he no longer actively heard cases or participated in court business. Urbom died in Lincoln, Nebraska on July 28, 2017, at the age of 91.

See also
 List of United States federal judges by longevity of service

References

Sources
 

1925 births
2017 deaths
People from Lincoln, Nebraska
People from Phelps County, Nebraska
Judges of the United States District Court for the District of Nebraska
United States district court judges appointed by Richard Nixon
20th-century American judges
United States Army soldiers
University of Michigan Law School alumni